Mario Arnold Segale (April 30, 1934 – October 27, 2018) was an American businessman and real estate developer. He was involved in various development projects in the Seattle area from the 1950s onwards. Nintendo’s mascot, Mario, was named after Segale while he was renting a warehouse to Nintendo.

Business career
Segale was born in Seattle in April 1934 to two Italian immigrants, Louis and Rina Segale, and was their only child. He graduated from Highline High School in 1952 and started a construction company with a single truck in 1957, the same year that he married his wife Donna. The couple worked to develop a privately-owned asphalt and construction business, M. A. Segale Inc., which grew into a major regional contractor and was sold for $60 million in 1998 to Irish concern CRH plc, for integration into its Oldcastle Materials unit. In 1978, the company was awarded a contract to construct a section of Interstate 82 near Prosser, Washington.

Segale and his son Mark were involved in other ventures, including real estate investments in the Seattle area. His company sold the land rights to the Emerald Downs racetrack in Auburn to the Muckleshoot tribe in 1996 for $73.6 million. Segale was also heavily involved in Tukwila-area projects, including a  development project called Tukwila South in the 2010s.

Political activities
A 2004 study by the Seattle Times found that Segale was one of the top 50 political contributors in the state of Washington. Overall, Mario and Mark Segale donated more than $90,000 to Democratic Party candidates and organizations between 2000 and 2007. Some of these contributions were to elected officials who worked to secure state legislative earmarks for roads in a privately owned development proposed by a Segale company.

Nintendo character
The video game company Nintendo began renting one of Segale's Tukwila warehouses in 1981 for use as their American headquarters. During development of the arcade game Donkey Kong, Segale visited the warehouse to collect overdue rent from Nintendo of America president Minoru Arakawa and berated him in front of employees. According to a widely circulated story, Arakawa and the other developers subsequently renamed the Donkey Kong player character to Mario, who was previously known as Jumpman.

This story was first published in David Sheff's 1993 book Game Over; however, because of a spelling error in this book, for years it was thought his last name was spelled Segali. It later appeared in Steven L. Kent's The Ultimate History of Video Games in 2001, and thereafter spread widely on the internet. In 2015, Nintendo confirmed that their Mario character was indeed named after Segale. Segale told The Seattle Times in 1993, "You might say I'm still waiting for my royalty checks."

Death
Segale died on October 27, 2018, at his home in Tukwila, Washington, aged 84. He was survived by his four children – Lisa Atkins, Mark Segale, Tina Covey, and Nita Johnson – and nine grandchildren.

References

1934 births
2018 deaths
American construction businesspeople
American people of Italian descent
Businesspeople from King County, Washington
Highline High School alumni
Mario (franchise)
Nintendo people
People from Tukwila, Washington